The Council elections held in Wolverhampton on Thursday 3 May 1984 were one third, and 20 of the 60 seats were up for election.

During the 1984 election the Conservatives gained the Bushbury seat from Labour whilst Labour gained the Wednesfield South, Oxley and Fallings Park seats from the Conservatives, the SDP/Liberal Alliance gained a Council seat beating Labour in Spring Vale.

Prior to the election the constitution of the Council was:

Labour 34
Conservative 24
Alliance 1
Vacant 1

Following the election the constitution of the Council was:

Labour 35
Conservative 23
Alliance 2

Election result

1984
1984 English local elections
1980s in the West Midlands (county)
May 1984 events in the United Kingdom